Isabel Manuel Nkavadeka is a Mozambican politician. She is a member of FRELIMO and was elected to the Assembly of the Republic of Mozambique in 1999 from the Cabo Delgado Province. In 2004, she was also a member of the Pan-African Parliament from Mozambique.

In 2005, she was Minister for Parliamentary Affairs.

References

Year of birth missing (living people)
Living people
Members of the Pan-African Parliament from Mozambique
21st-century Mozambican women politicians
21st-century Mozambican politicians
Members of the Assembly of the Republic (Mozambique)
FRELIMO politicians
20th-century Mozambican women politicians
20th-century Mozambican politicians
Women members of the Pan-African Parliament